194th Brigade may refer to:

194th Engineer Brigade (United States)
194th Armored Brigade (United States)
194th (2/1st South Scottish) Brigade

sl:Seznam brigad po zaporednih številkah (150. - 199.)#194. brigada